When Do You Commit Suicide? (Spanish: ¿Cuándo te suicidas?) is a 1932 American comedy film directed by Manuel Romero and starring Fernando Soler, Imperio Argentina and Manuel Russell. It was made by Paramount Pictures at its Joinville Studios in Paris. It is the Spanish-language version of its 1931 film When Do You Commit Suicide?. Paramount was at the time experimenting in the large-scale production of multilingual films at Joinville.

Cast
 Fernando Soler as Xavier Du Venoux  
 Imperio Argentina as Gabi  
 Manuel Russell as León Miroll  
 Carmen Navasqués as Viuda Damonthal  
 José Isbert as Petavey  
 María Anaya as Virginia  
 Enrique de Rosas as Moisés  
 Manuel Vico as Guillard  
 Carlos Martínez Baena as Abraham

References

Bibliography
 Rist, Peter H. Historical Dictionary of South American Cinema. Rowman & Littlefield, 2014.

External links
 

1932 films
1932 comedy films
1930s Spanish-language films
Spanish-language American films
American comedy films
Films directed by Manuel Romero
Remakes of American films
American multilingual films
Films shot at Joinville Studios
Paramount Pictures films
American black-and-white films
1932 multilingual films
1930s American films